Thelyssa callisto is a species of extremely small deep water sea snail, a marine gastropod mollusk in the family Seguenziidae.

References

External links
 To Biodiversity Heritage Library (1 publication)
 To Encyclopedia of Life
 To USNM Invertebrate Zoology Mollusca Collection
 To World Register of Marine Species

callisto
Gastropods described in 1971